Ruxandra Dragomir and Laura Garrone were the defending champions but only Garrone competed that year with Sandra Cecchini.

Cecchini and Garrone lost in the semifinals to Petra Schwarz and Katarína Studeníková.

Radka Bobková and Petra Langrová won in the final 6–4, 6–1 against Schwarz and Studeníková.

Seeds
Champion seeds are indicated in bold text while text in italics indicates the round in which those seeds were eliminated.

 Karina Habšudová /  Natalia Medvedeva (first round)
 Silvia Farina /  Karin Kschwendt (quarterfinals)
 Sandra Cecchini /  Laura Garrone (semifinals)
 Radka Bobková /  Petra Langrová (champions)

Draw

External links
 1995 Internazionali Femminili di Palermo Doubles Draw

Internazionali Femminili di Palermo
1995 WTA Tour